Colin Walsh (born 2002) is an Irish hurler. At the club level he plays with Kanturk, while he is also a member of the Cork senior hurling team.

Career

Walsh first played hurling and Gaelic football at juvenile and underage levels with the Kanturk club, before progressing to adult level as a dual player. He was part of the Kanturk senior hurling team that won the Cork SAHC title after a defeat of Fr. O'Neill's in the 2021 final. He was also part of the Kanturk intermediate football team that won the Cork PIFC title after a defeat of Bantry Blues in 2022.

Walsh first appeared on the inter-county scene as a member of the Cork minor hurling team in 2019. He later progressed to under-20 level as a dual player, and won a Munster U20FC title in 2021. 

Walsh joined the Cork senior hurling team during the pre-season Munster Senior Hurling League.

Career statistics

Honours

Kanturk
Cork Senior A Hurling Championship: 2021
Cork Premier Intermediate Football Championship: 2022

Cork
Munster Senior Hurling League: 2023
Munster Under-20 Football Championship: 2021

References

2002 births
Living people
Kanturk hurlers
Kanturk Gaelic footballers
Cork inter-county hurlers
Cork inter-county Gaelic footballers